Ido B & Zooki is an Israeli hip-hop/EDM duo from Tel Aviv, Israel comprising Ido Ben Dov (Ido B) and Zook Algasi (Zooki).

Biography 
Ido Ben Dov and Zook Algasi grew up in Modi'in, Israel. They studied together until high school.

Music career
They began their careers in 2009 performing in clubs around Israel and accumulated a large fan base by releasing songs in various genres produced using Cubase and Ableton Live.

2013 was their breakout year which saw them nominated for the MTV Europe Music Award for Best Israeli Act.

In 2014 they were considered one of the 'hottest' groups in the electronic music scene among young audiences.

In 2021, they participated in the fourth season of The X Factor Israel, in the goal of representing Israel in the Eurovision Song Contest 2022. They were eliminated in the chairs round.

Discography 

 Collection I (2016)
 Collection II (2016)
 Drops (2017)

References 

21st-century Israeli male singers
Israeli hip hop record producers
Israeli electronic music groups
The X Factor contestants